Muna is an Austronesian language spoken principally on the island of Muna as well as North-west Buton Island, off the southeast coast of Sulawesi in Indonesia. the island of Tobea Besar. The language is well-documented, especially by linguist René van den Berg. In 2010, the language had around  speakers.

Classification
Muna belongs to the Muna–Buton subgroup, which is a branch of the larger Celebic subgroup. Within the Muna–Buton languages, Muna is the largest member of the Munic subbranch, which also includes smaller languages such as Pancana, Kioko, Liabuku, Kaimbulawa, and Busoa.

Muna forms a dialect web with the other languages of Sulawesi and Buton.

Dialects
Muna has three dialects:
The "Standard" Muna is the most widely spoken, found in the northern and central part of Muna Island, as well as on the northwestern coast of Buton Island and in 1989 had around 150,000 speakers
the Tiworo dialect, spoken on Muna in the northwestern Tikep district with about 10,000 speakers
southern Muna, with two subdialects: and Siompu (~7000 speakers) and the various Gumas dialects (~60,000 speakers)
Differences between these dialects are mostly lexical, but also phonological.

Health

In the Ethnologue database, Muna is classified "threatened" in category 6b, meaning "The language is used for face-to-face communication within all generations, but it is losing users." The language of instruction in academia in Muna-speaking areas in Indonesian, except in lower forms but Muna is being taught in some primary schools and thus being acquired by the next generation.

Despite the fact that Indonesian is used in schools, Muna is the dominant language and is spoken in all other areas. The vast majority of the population of Muna is fluent in the languages, but not all are fluent in Indonesian Despite its small population and the fact that it is not used as the main medium of instruction in schools, the Muna language does not seem to be in immediate danger. Its population of fluent speakers on the island has stayed fairly stable between 1989 and 2007.

Phonology

Consonants
Muna has the following consonant phonemes.

Notes:
The phoneme  is realized as a labiodental approximant  before unrounded vowels, and as a bilabial approximant  before rounded vowels.
In rapid speech, the sequences  have trilled allophones  in stressed position.

Vowels
They can freely combine into sequences of two or three vowels. Sequences of two like vowels are pronounced as a long vowel, e.g. 'knee'. In sequences of three vowels, there is an optional non-phonemic glottal stop after the first vowel, e.g. 'it has veins'.

Syllable structure
Like many other languages on Sulawesi, Muna only has open syllables of the types CV (consonant-vowel) and V (vowel), e.g.   'plantation',   'citronella',   'I will wash them with it'. Loanwords from Malay/Indonesian and other source languages are adapted to the syllable structure of Muna:   < Malay  'work',   < Malay  'office' (from Dutch ),   < Malay  'time' (from Arabic ).

Grammar

Verbs
Verbs are inflected for mood and person (of both subject and object). Person marking is strictly nominative–accusative: person marking prefixes indicate the subject of transitive and intransitive verbs, while person marking suffixes are used to mark the direct and indirect object.

There are three verb classes, which have slightly different forms for the subject prefix. The classes are named after the first person singular prefix.

For ae-class and ao-class verbs, mood is only distinguished by the use of the respective subject prefix:

 'we read' (realis) ~  'we will read' (irrealis)
 'he sleeps' (realis) ~  'he will sleep' (irrealis)

With a-class verbs, irrealis mood is additionally marked by the infix <um>:

 'it flies' (realis) ~  'it will fly' (irrealis)

Intransitive verbs mostly employ a-class or ao-class prefixes. As a general rule, a-class verbs are dynamic intransitive verbs, while ao-class verbs are stative intransitive verbs. With a few exceptions, transitive verbs use ae-class prefixes with an indefinite object, but a-class prefixes with a definite object.
 'He took a machete' (indefinite, ae-class prefix)
 'He took his machete' (definite, a-class prefix)

There are two sets of object suffixes, marking direct and indirect objects.

Combinations of two suffixes are restricted to indirect object suffixes + the third person singular direct object suffix -e:
 'I will buy it for you.'

References

Further reading
 

Muna–Buton languages
Languages of Sulawesi